The following are  lists of gold mines and are subsidiary to the list of mines article and lists working, defunct and planned mines that have substantial gold output, organized by country.

North America
List of gold mines in Canada
List of gold mines in the United States

Caribbean 
Haiti
Mont Organisé gold mine
 Dominican Republic
 Pueblo Viejo mine, Pueblo Viejo, Azua

Africa
 Democratic Republic of Congo
 Kibali Gold Mine
 Namoya Gold Mine
 Twangiza Gold Mine
 Egypt
 Alsukari
List of gold mines in Tanzania
 Ghana
Goldfields Tarkwa mine
Goldfields Damang mine
Anglogold Ashanti Iduaprem mine
Kinross Chirano Gold mine
Gold Star Wassa Mine
Mensin Gold Bibiani Mine
Perseus Edikan Gold Mine
Anglogold Ashanti Obuasi Gold Mine
Newmont Ahafo Gold Mine
Newmont Akyem Gold Mine
Asanko Gold Mine
South Africa
 Beatrix
 Erfdeel-Dankbaarheid
 Free State Geduld
 Jeanette
 Loraine
 Oryx
 President Brand
 President Steyn
 St. Helena
 Welkom
 Western Holdings

Oceania
List of gold mines in Australia

South America
Peru
 Rio Huaypetue mine

Europe

Finland
Lapland
 Ahmavaara mine
 Kittilä mine

United Kingdom

Scotland
 Beinn Chùirn
 Lowther Hills

Asia
List of gold mines in Mongolia
List of gold mines in Japan
India

See also
List of countries by gold production
List of largest gold mines by production

 Gold mines